Legend Quest is an American adventure television series that premiered on July 13, 2011, on the SyFy channel. The series follows historian and adventure-seeker Ashley Cowie in his quest to crack the code on his hunt for the most powerful lost treasures in the world. On March 12, 2012, TVWise reported that the series has been cancelled by Syfy.

Plot summary
In the introduction, Cowie states:

Team
 Ashley Cowie (Host/Conspiracy Theorist)
 Kinga Philipps (Field producer)
Paul "Crusher" Peddinghaus (Cameraman/D.O.P.)
José Gonzalez (Spanish translator/cameraman)
Jeremy Dell'ova (Cameraman/sound)

Episodes

Fabrication of shots/locations
In Season 1, Episode 3, during the search for The Holy Lance, the team claims to have gone to Area 51 before deciding they could not gain entry and ultimately abandoning the search. However, it has been pointed out that the unoccupied guard house that Ashley and Kinga are filmed in front of is not the entrance to Area 51 and that they, in fact, fabricated the shot from another location.

References

External links
syfy.com/legendquest

Syfy original programming
2011 American television series debuts
2011 American television series endings